Lockerby may refer to:

 Lockerby, Ontario, community in Ontario, Canada
 Lockerby, Greater Sudbury, Ontario, Canada
 Lockerby Composite School

See also
 Lockerbie (disambiguation)